Parisa Tabriz is an Iranian-American computer security expert who works for Google as a Vice President of engineering. She chose the title "Security Princess" on her business card.

Early life
Parisa Tabriz was born to an Iranian father, a doctor, and an American mother, a nurse, of Polish-American descent. She grew up in the suburbs of Chicago and is the older sister of two brothers. Tabriz was not exposed to coding and computer science until her first year at university.

Education
Tabriz initially enrolled at the University of Illinois at Urbana–Champaign to study computer engineering, but soon became interested in computer science instead. She completed a bachelor of science and master of science degree at the university and did research in wireless security and attacks on privacy-enhancing technologies, co-authoring papers with her advisor Nikita Borisov. She was an active member of a student club interested in computer security, which she joined because her own website was hacked.

Career
Tabriz was offered a summer internship with Google's security team while at college, and joined the company a few months after her graduation in 2007. While preparing to attend a conference in Tokyo with Google, she decided to use the job title "Security Princess" on her business card rather than the conventional "information security engineer" since it sounded less boring and considered it ironic. Tabriz trained Google staff interested in learning more about security and worked with youth at DEFCON and Girl Scouts of the USA to expose a more diverse set of people to the field of computer security.

In 2013, Tabriz took over responsibility for the security of Google Chrome.

In 2013, Tabriz conducted the talk "Got SSL?" at the Chrome Dev Summit.

In 2014, Tabriz started an effort to drive adoption of the HTTPS protocol. In 2015, less than 50% of traffic seen by Chrome was over HTTPS, and by 2019, the percentage of HTTPS traffic had increased to 73-95% across all platforms. Tabriz has spoken out against government interception of HTTPS connections on the public Internet.

In 2014 Tabriz conducted the talk "Do Know Evil" at the Chrome Developers Conference.

In 2016, Tabriz took over responsibility for Project Zero, an offensive security research group.

In 2016 Tabriz was the keynote speaker at the Python Conference (PyCon) in Portland, Oregon.

In 2018, Tabriz was the keynote speaker at Black Hat Conference.

In 2018, in response to the RSA Conference having only one non-male keynote speaker in a line-up of 20 keynotes, Tabriz co-founded the Our Security Advocates conference, OURSA. In only five days, Tabriz and organizers pulled together a speaker line-up consisting of expert speakers from under-represented backgrounds, 14 speakers of which were women.

In 2020, Tabriz became head of product, Engineering, & UX, Chrome.

Recognition 
In 2012, Forbes included her in their "Top 30 People Under 30 To Watch in the Technology Industry" list.

In 2017, Wired included her in their list of 20 Tech Visionaries.

In 2018, Fortune included her in their annual "40 under 40" most influence young people in business list.

References

External links 
 
 
 Parisa Tabriz on Google AI

1983 births
Living people
Google employees
American people of Iranian descent
American people of Polish descent
People associated with computer security
Grainger College of Engineering alumni
People in information technology